Nicolas Carone (June 4, 1917 – July 15, 2010) belonged to the early generation of New York School Abstract Expressionist artists. Their artistic innovation by the 1950s had been recognized internationally, including in London and Paris. New York School Abstract Expressionism, represented by Jackson Pollock, Willem de Kooning, Franz Kline,    Conrad Marca-Relli and others, became a leading art movement of the postwar era.

Biography
Carone was born June 4, 1917 into an Italian-American family in New York City. They moved to Hoboken, New Jersey, where he grew up. He began formal art studies at the age of eleven at the Leonardo da Vinci School located at St. Mark's Church on E. 10th St. He studied at the National Academy of Design under Leon Kroll, Art Students League of New York, Hans Hofmann School of Fine Arts, and the Rome Academy of Fine Arts.

In 1941 he won the Rome Prize and in 1949 a Fulbright Fellowship. Both gave him an opportunity to study art in Italy. During his time in Italy after World War II, he came into personal contact with important Italian painters, particularly Giorgio Morandi.

After returning to the US, Carone continued to paint and exhibited works in the 9th Street Art Exhibition in 1951. Along with other first generation abstract expressionists, he also showed his work at the Stable Gallery. Carone was a part of the Abstract Expressionist movement, which relied heavily on Surrealism, poetry, and interpretations of Jungian psychology. He was a good friend of Jackson Pollock, a noted abstract painter. He was later interviewed by authors Steven Naifeh and Gregory White Smith for their biography, Jackson Pollock: An American Saga.

Nicolas Carone's work is in the collections of museums including the Whitney Museum of American Art, the Metropolitan Museum of Art, the Hirshhorn Museum and Sculpture Garden, the Baltimore Museum of Art, and the Mobile Museum of Art. Recent exhibits of his work were held at the Washburn Gallery in New York City from February 2 to March 31, 2012, and the Watson MacRae Gallery in South Florida from March 2 to April 3, 2010.  His work was exhibited by a number of galleries, including at the Anita Shapolsky Gallery, Frumkin Gallery, Stable Gallery, and Staempfli Gallery.

Carone taught at universities including Yale University, Columbia University, Brandeis University, Cornell University, Cooper Union, School of Visual Arts, and Skowhegan School. He was a founding faculty member of the New York Studio School of Drawing, Painting and Sculpture, where he taught for 25 years.  In 1988 he founded the International School of Art, located first in Todi, Italy and then in Nearby Montecastello. Carone was consulted by dealers, collectors and film makers regarding his expertise on Arshile Gorky and Pollock, including for the films Pollock, starring Ed Harris, and Who the *$&% Is Jackson Pollock?

He died July 15, 2010 at the age of 93.

References

Sources
Marika Herskovic, American Abstract and Figurative Expressionism Style Is Timely Art Is Timeless An Illustrated Survey With Artists' Statements, Artwork and Biographies. (New York School Press, 2009.) . p. 64–67
Marika Herskovic, American Abstract Expressionism of the 1950s An Illustrated Survey, (New York School Press, 2003.) . p. 74–77
Marika Herskovic, New York School Abstract Expressionists Artists Choice by Artists, (New York School Press, 2000.) . p. 8; p. 16; p. 19; p. 25; p. 36; p. 94–97
Leja, Michael, "Reframing Abstract Expressionism: Subjectivity and Painting in the 1940s. Yale University Press. 1993. 
Hilton Kramer, Nicolas Carone Shows He’s Still Unsurpassed On the Female Nude | The New York Observer Nov. 2005
Nicolas Carone at the Lohin Geduld Gallery: list of exhibitions Nicolas Carone (American), 1917: Featured artist works, exhibitions and biography fromLohin Geduld Gallery
Thomas Longhi, The Brooklyn Rail

External links 
Smithsonian Archive Interview 
New York Studio School 
Brooklyn Rail interview

Nicolas Carone: In Memoriam by David Rigsbee, The Brooklyn Rail

1917 births
2010 deaths
Abstract expressionist artists
20th-century American painters
American male painters
21st-century American painters
Painters from New York City
American people of Italian descent
Artists from Hoboken, New Jersey
Art Students League of New York alumni
20th-century American male artists